Khimki Forest is a forest near the Russian city of Moscow covering about 1000 hectares. It is part of the so-called "Green Belt" around Moscow. An $8 billion high speed road, the Moscow–Saint Petersburg motorway (M11), has been proposed to go through the forest to connect Moscow and Saint Petersburg. For this purpose, part of the forest would have been cut down. The construction triggered large protests, which turned violent in July 2010. On 26 August 2010, President Dmitry Medvedev ordered the construction to be halted.

Protests over planned highway

History of opposition
The M11, a new toll motorway, was proposed to go through the forest. The roadway would connect Moscow and Saint Petersburg.

The proposed road attracted local and international opposition due to deforestation and other environmental issues. The forest's fauna includes foxes, elk, wild boars and a number of species of insects and plants considered endangered.

Logging in the forest started on 14 July 2010, and activists immediately clashed with the construction workers. The activists included local people and a group called "Ecological Defense of the Moscow Region", along with Greenpeace Russia, and the "Left Front" civil movement. On 15 July 2010, environmentalists started to maintain a round-the-clock vigil to prevent the trees from being cut down. On July 28, 2010, dozens of anarchists and antifascists stormed government offices in Khimki. Windows were broken and the assailants left a graffiti with the text "Save the Russian Forest."  On 22 August, 2,000 activists attended a concert that was held to protest the construction. On 22 August, two opposition leaders and a human rights activist who were participating in rallies marking the National Flag Day of Russia were detained. They claimed that they were detained "to prevent the action in defense of the Khimki Forest."

Russia's Supreme Court has ruled that the construction of the highway is not illegal. The activists' Khimki Forest Defense movement has filed a suit with the European Court of Human Rights in Strasbourg.

In August, the country's largest political party, United Russia asked the President to stop the construction. Reuters analysts speculated the move was an attempt by the party to "pre-empt wider protest actions" which could have lowered the high popularity enjoyed by the Kremlin and the party.

In late August, rock star Bono of the group U2, while his band was on tour in Russia, took a high-profile stand against the highway construction.  Asking Russian rock star Yuri Shevchuk, an outspoken critic of the highway's planned route, who had made headlines confronting Vladimir Putin in a face-to-face meeting in May, to join him on stage at a concert, Bono and Shevchuk sang a Bob Dylan tune (Knockin' on Heaven's Door) in front of 60,000 people.  Bono said in an interview that he regretted not raising the issue in his own meeting with the president.

Attacks
Various protesters and journalists have been attacked and intimidated by both the police and unknown assailants. Three journalists - Anatoliy Adamchuk from Zhukovskiye Vesti, Mikhail Beketov from Khimkinskaya Pravda and Oleg Kashin from Kommersant - have been beaten up in what are thought to be attacks linked to their coverage of the protests.

President Medvedev suspends the project
On 26 August 2010, President Dmitry Medvedev ordered the construction of the highway to be halted, and asked for a period of further discussion.
"Taking into account the amount of appeals [against the construction], I have made a decision...to suspend the implementation of the decree on the construction of the toll highway and to hold additional public and expert discussions."
One of the activists who had fought to protect the forest hailed the President's decision as "victory" for the activists. City district prefect and former environmental official Oleg Mitvol has stated that the motorway could be built through another area in the north of the capital. When he presented his idea to Mayor of Moscow Yuri Luzhkov, the mayor supported it. Aleksey Knizhnikov of the World Wide Fund for Nature (WWF) believes that if the logging was stopped right now, the forest would recover in a decade.

The role of the French multinational Vinci S.A.
The French multinational Vinci jointly with some individuals from Lebanon and Syria owns 50% of the North-West Concession Company, the concessionaire of the project. Soon after the President of Russia Mr. Medvedev put a halt on construction under pressure of the civil protests in August, 2010, Mr. Emanuel Quidet of the French Chamber of Commerce in Russia intervened, asking Mr. Medvedev to resume works as soon as possible. During the discussion, representatives of Vinci threatened Russian Government with 4 billion rubles (about 100 million euro) of compensations in case of a longer delay for the change of the routing.

The Movement to Defend Khimki Forest together with the Bankwatch CEE and through the UN Global Compact has written several letters to the executive board of Vinci, indicating environmental damage to the forest and human rights abuses, connected with the project. Vinci was asked to start discussion about changing the route and to intervene with the Russian authorities, but it refused to cooperate, claiming that it had no power to change the route, chosen by the Russian authorities, and denying any connection between the violence and the project.

See also
Antiseliger
Environment of Russia
Moscow–Saint Petersburg motorway

References

 Dobson, William J. (3 March 2011). One woman’s fight to preserve a Russian forest. The Washington Post.

External links
Map of Khimki Forest
Save Khimki Forest, international website
Defence of the Khimki Forest, a Facebook group
Khimki Forest on Twitter
Infographic and cartographic dossier on Khimki Forest
An engineering mom leads effort to save an old-growth Russian forest  April 30, 2012

Khimki
Geography of Moscow Oblast
Forests of Russia